Elect the Dead Symphony is the first live album by System of a Down frontman Serj Tankian.  It is available in CD, CD/DVD, LP, and Digital Download formats.  It features the Auckland Philharmonia Orchestra, along with Dan Monti on acoustic guitar and backing vocals, performing at the Auckland Town Hall in Auckland, New Zealand.  Orchestral arrangements were by John Psathas.  Material for the performance is from Tankian's solo debut, Elect the Dead with some additional previously unreleased songs.

The sole studio track is the first officially released studio recording of "Charades", with the revised title "The Charade". This song was known to have been considered for System of a Down's Hypnotize album and a rehearsal was recorded, a brief excerpt of which appears on the DVD side of that album's dualdisc edition. It was not included on the album, but a live version appeared on the Axis of Justice compilation the following year. The version on Elect the Dead Symphony is the first studio recording of the song to be released, and has also been released as a single. A live version of the song also appears on the album.

Elect the Dead Symphony was released on February 23, 2010 on iTunes and March 9, 2010 in all other formats.

Track listing

Chart positions

References

External links
 Elect The Dead Symphony at Discogs.com

Serj Tankian live albums
2010 live albums
Serjical Strike Records live albums